Malcolm Bunche (born October 16, 1991) is an American football offensive tackle for the San Antonio Brahmas of the XFL. He was originally signed by the Philadelphia Eagles, following the 2015 NFL Draft. He played college football at Miami and UCLA. He was also a member of the Hamilton Tiger-Cats of the Canadian Football League (CFL), the Jacksonville Jaguars and New York Giants of the National Football League (NFL), and the DC Defenders of the XFL.

College career
Bunche enrolled at the University of Miami in January 2010. He was relegated to the practice squad for the first year. He earned a letter in each of the following years.

Bunche began graduate studies at UCLA in 2014. He played nine games for the UCLA Bruins on special teams and as an offensive lineman.

Professional career

Philadelphia Eagles
After going undrafted during the 2015 NFL Draft, Bunche signed as a free agent with the Philadelphia Eagles. On September 4, 2015, Bunche was cut in the final round of preseason cuts. On September 6, 2015, he was signed to the Eagles' practice squad.

On August 15, 2016, Bunche was waived by the Eagles.

Hamilton Tiger-Cats
Bunche was briefly a member of the Hamilton Tiger-Cats of the Canadian Football League (CFL), having been a member during training camp.

Jacksonville Jaguars
Bunche was signed by the Jacksonville Jaguars on August 3, 2017. He was waived on September 1, 2017.

New York Giants
On May 14, 2018, Bunche signed with the New York Giants. He was waived on September 1, 2018.

Arizona Hotshots
In 2018, Bunche signed with the Arizona Hotshots of the Alliance of American Football for the 2019 season.

New York Giants (second stint)
On August 5, 2019, Bunche was signed by the New York Giants. He was waived on August 31, 2019.

Washington Redskins
On October 8, 2019, Bunche was signed to the Washington Redskins practice squad.  Three days later Bunche was released.

DC Defenders
On November 22, 2019, Bunche was drafted by the DC Defenders in the 2020 XFL Supplemental Draft. He had his contract terminated when the league suspended operations on April 10, 2020.

San Antonio Brahmas 
On November 17, 2022, Bunche was drafted by the San Antonio Brahmas of the XFL. He signed with the team on February 21, 2023.

References

External links
 Miami Hurricanes Player Bio
 UCLA Bruins Player bio
 Philadelphia Eagles Player bio

Living people
1991 births
People from Newark, Delaware
Players of American football from Delaware
Sportspeople from the Delaware Valley
American football offensive guards
American football offensive tackles
Miami Hurricanes football players
UCLA Bruins football players
Philadelphia Eagles players
Hamilton Tiger-Cats players
American players of Canadian football
Jacksonville Jaguars players
New York Giants players
Arizona Hotshots players
Washington Redskins players
DC Defenders players
San Antonio Brahmas players